William Fitzherbert (c. 1520–1559?), of Lichfield and Swynnerton, Staffordshire and the Inner Temple, London, was an English politician.

He was a member (MP) of the Parliament of England for Lichfield in March 1553.

References

1520 births
1559 deaths
Members of the Parliament of England (pre-1707) for Lichfield
Members of the Inner Temple
English MPs 1553 (Edward VI)